"Get the Balance Right!" is the seventh single by British electronic band Depeche Mode, released on 31 January 1983. Recorded at Blackwing Studios, it is the first Depeche Mode single with Alan Wilder as an official band member; Wilder also co-wrote the B-side track "The Great Outdoors!" with Martin Gore. It is also one of the first Depeche Mode songs to feature guitar; according to Andy Fletcher, the guitar was processed through a synth and phased out of time to make it sound more interesting.

"Get the Balance Right!" was not included on the following album Construction Time Again (although it appears on the deluxe edition of the album), but does appear on the American compilation People Are People and the compilation The Singles 81–85.

B-sides 
The B-side is "The Great Outdoors!", an instrumental written by Martin Gore and Wilder. It was featured on the Broken Frame Tour as the introduction theme for selected shows, after an incident with their Revox machine that destroyed almost all their previous intro, "Oberkorn (It's a Small Town)".

Included on the 12" releases is "Tora! Tora! Tora! (Live)", the first live song released on a Depeche Mode single. A limited edition 12" of the single was released, which features more live tracks: "My Secret Garden", "See You", and "Satellite". It was the first Depeche Mode single to have a limited edition.

Music video 
In the music video, Wilder lip-syncs the first lines of the song, even though Dave Gahan is the lead singer. The director Kevin Hewitt made the assumption that Wilder was the singer and they were too embarrassed to point out his mistake.

Track listings 
All songs written by Martin Gore, except "The Great Outdoors!" which was written by Gore and Alan Wilder.

7" vinyl single 
UK: Mute / 7Bong2

12" vinyl single 
UK: Mute / 12Bong2

UK: Mute / L12Bong2 (Limited edition)

US: Sire / 0-29704Released 7 September 1983. The first two tracks on side two are listed as one track on the sleeve, when they are actually two separate tracks.

CD single 
UK: Mute / CDBong2Released 25 November 1991, from the Singles Box Set #2.
US: Sire/Reprise 40295-2Released 26 November 1991, from the Singles Box Set #2.
US: Reprise CD BONG 2 (R2 78890A)Released 30 March 2004, from the Singles Box Set #1 reissue.

Charts

References

External links
 Single information from the official Depeche Mode web site
 Music video at the official Depeche Mode web site
 [ AllMusic review]

1983 singles
Depeche Mode songs
Songs written by Martin Gore
Song recordings produced by Daniel Miller
1983 songs
Mute Records singles
UK Independent Singles Chart number-one singles